The women's mass start race of the 2014–15 ISU Speed Skating World Cup 7, arranged in the Gunda Niemann-Stirnemann-Halle in Erfurt, Germany, was held on 22 March 2015.

Results
The race took place on Saturday, 22 March, scheduled in the afternoon session, at 17:11.

References

Women mass start
7